Lamprima adolphinae is a species of stag beetle in the family Lucanidae found in New Guinea and Papua.

References

External links
Photos and information on L. adolphinae

Lucanidae
Beetles described in 1875
Arthropods of New Guinea